Broadmoor is a neighborhood of 553 homes in central Little Rock, Arkansas, located in the University District. It was developed west of Hayes Street on the western edge of the city beginning in 1953. A portion of the neighborhood lies on land occupied by the former hunting lodge of Raymond Rebsamen. A small lake near the lodge, Rebsamen Lake, was expanded in 1954 and is now known as Broadmoor Lake.

The Broadmoor Property Owners Association was formed on April 30, 1954, upon the petition of the developer, E.L. Fausett, of Broadmoor Builders, Inc. Petition to Grant Certificate of Incorporation and Constitution of the Broadmoor Property Owners Association, Book 8, pages 22 through 26 of the Benevolent Association Records of Pulaski County, Arkansas.

On September 19, 1978, the City of Little Rock created the Broadmoor Recreational Improvement District Number Two of the City of Little Rock, Arkansas. City of Little Rock Ordinance Number 13,510. The District encompasses the entire Broadmoor Addition and has the authority to assess taxes on lots to finance improvements to common areas, such as the park, lake, and clubhouse.

Fifty years later, the neighborhood is now in the heart of the city, 10 minutes from just about everything in town. It is across the street from the University of Arkansas at Little Rock in the University District, that has grown to be Arkansas's second-largest university. We have beautiful mature trees, a 10-acre park, a great 14-acre lake, and a pool.

Broadmoor Broadmoor Property Owner's Association Web Site

Google Map of Broadmoor

Neighborhoods in Little Rock, Arkansas